Brightman Street Bridge may refer to:

 Veterans Memorial Bridge (Bristol County, Massachusetts) - the replacement bridge over the Taunton River connecting Somerset, Massachusetts and Fall River, Massachusetts and formerly known as the "Brightman Street Bridge Replacement" or "New Brightman Street Bridge".
 Brightman Street Bridge - the original bridge.